Robert McGregor Scotten (1891–1968) was an American ambassador to Costa Rica, Ecuador, and New Zealand.

Born in Detroit, Michigan on August 18, 1891, his father was Oren Scotten and his mother was Mary Clarke (McGregor) Scotten. Scotten served as Foreign Service officer; U.S. Consul in Asuncion from 1926 to 1927. He was ambassador to the Dominican Republic from 1940 to 1942, later he served as ambassador to Costa Rica from 1942 to 1943, Ecuador from 1943 to 1947, New Zealand first as minister from 1947 to 1948 and then as ambassador (reaccredited) 1948 to 1955. He died in 1968.

References

1891 births
1968 deaths
Ambassadors of the United States to Costa Rica
Ambassadors of the United States to Ecuador
Ambassadors of the United States to New Zealand
Ambassadors of the United States to the Dominican Republic
United States Foreign Service personnel
20th-century American diplomats